(Adventure Island IV for short) is a 1994 platform game released by Hudson Soft for the Family Computer; it was the final game released for the console in Japan. The game was never released outside of Japan.

Summary

Unlike previous entries in the Adventure Island series, Bōken Jima IV plays less like a linear platformer and more like an action/adventure platformer, similar to the later Wonder Boy games. Adventure Island IV also has a unique password system that the earlier games in the series did not have. It also features an egg item that allows the player character to teleport to the pedestal where the player puts it. There is a large variety of weapons to choose from which are unlocked by the player throughout the game. Many special items can be won in races and challenges, such as an angel/fairy item that allows the player character to re-spawn once, at the spot where they lost all hearts and even a compass that acts like a map showing the player with an arrow where to go. Whereas in the earlier Adventure Island games the player character had a food meter and when it runs out, the player lost a life, in Adventure Island IV, the player simply collects 8 food items to regain 1 heart as health.

Story
The evil Eggplant Wizard kidnaps Master Higgins' dinosaur friends and later his girlfriend Tina, Master Higgins starts an adventure to save them and stop the evil eggplant once and for all.

References

External links
Adventure Island IV in classic gaming 
Takahashi Meijin no Bōkenjima IV in MobyGames

Adventure Island (franchise)
Nintendo Entertainment System games
Nintendo Entertainment System-only games
Japan-exclusive video games
1994 video games
Metroidvania games
Video games developed in Japan
Video games set on fictional islands

Action-adventure games
Single-player video games
Now Production games
Hudson Soft games